Campana Serenade is an old-time radio music program in the United States. It was broadcast on NBC from October 10, 1942 to April 10, 1943, and on CBS from September 4, 1943 to February 16, 1944.  

Dick Powell starred in both versions of Campana Serenade. The 1942-1943 episodes also featured the Music Maids, with Matty Malneck and his orchestra. Joining Powell in the 1943-1944 programs were singer Martha Tilton and Lud Gluskin and his orchestra. Henry Charles was the announcer. 

Originating at KNX in Los Angeles, California, the show was sponsored by Campana, a cosmetics manufacturer, advertising its Campana Balm, Dreskin, Coolies, DDD, and Solitaire Make-Up products.

The trade publication Broadcasting reported that the break in the program's broadcasts resulted from a shortage of glycerine.

References

External links 
 Episode of Campana Serenade from the Internet Archive

1942 radio programme debuts
1944 radio programme endings
CBS Radio programs
NBC radio programs
American music radio programs
1940s American radio programs
Radio during World War II